Phrynobatrachus is a genus of Sub-Saharan frogs that form the monogeneric family Phrynobatrachidae. Their common name is puddle frogs, dwarf puddle frogs, African puddle frogs, or African river frogs.
The common name, puddle frog, refers to the fact that many species breed in temporary waterbodies such as puddles.

Phrynobatrachus are among the most common amphibians in Africa. They are typically small (mostly less than ), fast-moving frogs. They occupy a variety of habitats from dry savannas to rainforests. Most species deposit many small eggs as a surface clutch in standing or slowly moving water and have exotrophic tadpoles.

Taxonomy
Phrynobatrachidae has earlier been considered as a subfamily of Ranidae, but its recognition as a family is now well-established. It is probably most closely related to Petropedetidae and Pyxicephalidae or Ptychadenidae.

This large genus may be further divided into three major clades. These clades could be treated as different genera, but this arrangement is not yet in use.

Species
There are currently 96 species in this genus:

 Phrynobatrachus acridoides (Cope, 1867)
 Phrynobatrachus acutirostris Nieden, 1912
 Phrynobatrachus afiabirago Ofori-Boateng, Leaché, Obeng-Kankam, Kouamé, Hillers & Rödel, 2018
 Phrynobatrachus africanus (Hallowell, 1858)
 Phrynobatrachus albifer (Ahl, 1924)
 Phrynobatrachus albomarginatus De Witte, 1933
 Phrynobatrachus alleni Parker, 1936
 Phrynobatrachus ambanguluensis Greenwood, Loader, Lawson, Greenbaum, and Zimkus, 2020
 Phrynobatrachus amieti Nečas, Dolinay, Zimkus, and Gvoždík, 2021
 Phrynobatrachus annulatus Perret, 1966
 Phrynobatrachus anotis Schmidt and Inger, 1959
 Phrynobatrachus arcanus Gvoždík, Nečas, Dolinay, Zimkus, Schmitz, and Fokam, 2020
 Phrynobatrachus asper Laurent, 1951
 Phrynobatrachus auritus Boulenger, 1900
 Phrynobatrachus batesii (Boulenger, 1906)
 Phrynobatrachus bequaerti (Barbour and Loveridge, 1929)
 Phrynobatrachus bibita Goutte, Reyes-Velasco, and Boissinot, 2019
 Phrynobatrachus breviceps Pickersgill, 2007
 Phrynobatrachus brevipalmatus (Ahl, 1925)
 Phrynobatrachus brongersmai Parker, 1936
 Phrynobatrachus bullans Crutsinger, Pickersgill, Channing, and Moyer, 2004
 Phrynobatrachus calcaratus (Peters, 1863)
 Phrynobatrachus chukuchuku Zimkus, 2009
 Phrynobatrachus congicus (Ahl, 1925)
 Phrynobatrachus cornutus (Boulenger, 1906)
 Phrynobatrachus cricogaster Perret, 1957
 Phrynobatrachus cryptotis Schmidt and Inger, 1959
 Phrynobatrachus dalcqi Laurent, 1952
 Phrynobatrachus danko Blackburn, 2010
 Phrynobatrachus dendrobates (Boulenger, 1919)
 Phrynobatrachus discogularis Pickersgill, Zimkus, and Raw, 2017
 Phrynobatrachus dispar (Peters, 1870)
 Phrynobatrachus elberti (Ahl, 1925)
 Phrynobatrachus francisci Boulenger, 1912
 Phrynobatrachus fraterculus (Chabanaud, 1921)
 Phrynobatrachus gastoni Barbour and Loveridge, 1928
 Phrynobatrachus ghanensis Schiøtz, 1964
 Phrynobatrachus giorgii De Witte, 1921
 Phrynobatrachus graueri (Nieden, 1911)
 Phrynobatrachus guineensis Guibé and Lamotte, 1962
 Phrynobatrachus gutturosus (Chabanaud, 1921)
 Phrynobatrachus hieroglyphicus Rödel, Ohler, and Hillers, 2010
 Phrynobatrachus horsti Rödel, Burger, Zassi-Boufou, Emmrich, Penner, and Barej, 2015
 Phrynobatrachus hylaios Perret, 1959
 Phrynobatrachus inexpectatus Largen, 2001
 Phrynobatrachus intermedius Rödel, Boateng, Penner, and Hillers, 2009
 Phrynobatrachus irangi Drewes and Perret, 2000
 Phrynobatrachus jimzimkusi Zimkus, Gvoždík, and Gonwouo, 2013
 Phrynobatrachus kakamikro Schick, Zimkus, Channing, Köhler, and Lötters, 2010
 Phrynobatrachus keniensis Barbour and Loveridge, 1928
 Phrynobatrachus kinangopensis Angel, 1924
 Phrynobatrachus krefftii Boulenger, 1909
 Phrynobatrachus latifrons Ahl, 1924
 Phrynobatrachus leveleve Uyeda, Drewes, and Zimkus, 2007
 Phrynobatrachus liberiensis Barbour and Loveridge, 1927
 Phrynobatrachus mababiensis FitzSimons, 1932
 Phrynobatrachus maculiventris Guibé and Lamotte, 1958
 Phrynobatrachus manengoubensis (Angel, 1940)
 Phrynobatrachus mayokoensis  Rödel, Burger, Zassi-Boulou, Emmrich, Penner, and Barej, 2015
 Phrynobatrachus mbabo Gvoždík, Nečas, Dolinay, Zimkus, Schmitz, and Fokam, 2020
 Phrynobatrachus minutus (Boulenger, 1895)
 Phrynobatrachus nanus (Ahl, 1925)
 Phrynobatrachus natalensis (Smith, 1849)
 Phrynobatrachus njiomock Zimkus and Gvoždík, 2013
 Phrynobatrachus ogoensis (Boulenger, 1906)
 Phrynobatrachus pakenhami Loveridge, 1941
 Phrynobatrachus pallidus Pickersgill, 2007
 Phrynobatrachus parkeri De Witte, 1933
 Phrynobatrachus parvulus (Boulenger, 1905)
 Phrynobatrachus perpalmatus Boulenger, 1898
 Phrynobatrachus petropedetoides Ahl, 1924
 Phrynobatrachus phyllophilus Rödel and Ernst, 2002
 Phrynobatrachus pintoi Hillers, Zimkus, and Rödel, 2008
 Phrynobatrachus plicatus (Günther, 1858)
 Phrynobatrachus pygmaeus (Ahl, 1925)
 Phrynobatrachus rainerguentheri Rödel, Onadeko, Barej, and Sandberger, 2012
 Phrynobatrachus rouxi (Nieden, 1912)
 Phrynobatrachus rungwensis (Loveridge, 1932)
 Phrynobatrachus ruthbeateae Rödel, Doherty-Bone, Kouete, Janzen, Garrett, Browne, Gonwouo, Barej, and Sandberger, 2012
 Phrynobatrachus sandersoni (Parker, 1935)
 Phrynobatrachus scapularis (De Witte, 1933)
 Phrynobatrachus scheffleri (Nieden, 1911)
 Phrynobatrachus schioetzi Blackburn and Rödel, 2011
 Phrynobatrachus steindachneri Nieden, 1910
 Phrynobatrachus sternfeldi (Ahl, 1924)
 Phrynobatrachus stewartae Poynton and Broadley, 1985
 Phrynobatrachus sulfureogularis Laurent, 1951
 Phrynobatrachus taiensis Perret, 1988
 Phrynobatrachus tanoeensis Kpan, Kouamé, Barej, Adeba, Emmrich, Boateng, and Rödel, 2018
 Phrynobatrachus tokba (Chabanaud, 1921)
 Phrynobatrachus ukingensis (Loveridge, 1932)
 Phrynobatrachus ungujae Pickersgill, 2007
 Phrynobatrachus uzungwensis Grandison and Howell, 1983
 Phrynobatrachus versicolor Ahl, 1924
 Phrynobatrachus villiersi Guibé, 1959
 Phrynobatrachus werneri (Nieden, 1910)

References

 
Amphibians of Sub-Saharan Africa
Taxa named by Albert Günther
Amphibian genera
Taxonomy articles created by Polbot